Meenur is a village in Gudiyattam taluk, Vellore district, Tamil Nadu, India. Tamil is the spoken language.

Villages in Vellore district